Chuiyangliu is a residential community administrated by Shuangjing subdistrict (双井街道办事处), and is located in Chaoyang District of Beijing, China.

Chaoyang District, Beijing
Neighbourhoods of Beijing